Ho Chi Minh City Sign Language (HCMCSL), also known as Sai Gon Sign Language, is the language of many deaf communities in the south of Vietnam. Research on this sign language started when James Woodward came to Ha Noi in 1997 to do research about sign languages in Vietnam. It is about 50% cognate with the other sign languages of Vietnam, and its vocabulary has been extensively influenced by the French Sign Language once taught in Vietnamese schools for the deaf.

References

Languages of Vietnam
Sign languages